Fadel Benyaich or Benaich (born 1963 in Rabat, Morocco) is a senior member of the royal cabinet of King Mohammed VI, reportedly in charge of relations with Spain. He studied at the Collège Royal with Mohammed VI.

Business
Benayaich holds the franchise of French traiteur and pastry chef Patrick Lenôtre and runs boutiques in Rabat and Casablanca.

Personal life

Fadel Benyaich is the son of a surgeon who worked as the personal physician of Hassan II and was shot dead during the failed coup attempt in 1971, in addtittion to being the nephew of Colonel Ben Aïch, a close collaborator of General Moulay Hafid Alaoui, and who held this military rank without any military training.

His mother is Spanish from the region of Granada and his sister, Karima Benyaich, is the Ambassador of Morocco to Portugal. Another of sister of his, Inane Benayaich is the director of the Centre Régional d'Investissement de Rabat.

Benyaich also holds the Spanish citizenship.

See also
Fouad Ali El Himma
Mounir Majidi
Yassine Mansouri

References

Living people
People from Rabat
Moroccan civil servants
1963 births
Moroccan people of Spanish descent
Alumni of the Collège Royal (Rabat)
Mohammed V University alumni
Spanish people of Moroccan descent
Members of the Royal Cabinet of Mohammed VI of Morocco
Moroccan politicians
Moroccan businesspeople
Ambassadors of Morocco to Spain